Khatarnak is a 1974 Pakistani Punjabi erotic action film directed by Rehmat Ali. The lead cast includes Neelo, Yousuf Khan, Anita, Mustafa Qureshi, and Afzaal Ahmad.

Plot
The central idea of Khatarnak was taken from the 1914 Western novel The Lone Star Ranger. A young man seeks revenge for his parents who are murdered by a criminal gang.

Cast
 Neelo
 Yousuf Khan
 Anita
 Mustafa Qureshi
 Afzaal Ahmad
 Kemal Irani
 Ajmal
 Fazil Butt
 Seema
 Nanha
 Zarqa
 Raj Multani
 Azam
 Shehzad
 (Guest appearances: Nazli, Mizla, Humaira Choudhary)

Music and soundtracks
The music of Khatarnak was composed by Safdar Hussain and lyrics were penned by Khawaja Pervaiz:
 Akho Jee, Main Tahaday Naal Karni Aan Pyar... Singer(s): Rubina Badar
 Charian Khushian Yaar Dian, Meray Lagday Na Kidray Pair... Singer(s): Mala
 Hey Main, Dil Neun Dena, Tu Pawen Karen Lakh Minta... Singer(s): Mala
 Pyar Meinu Kar, Meray Wallun Ajj Teinu Purian Ijaztan... Singer(s): Mala
 Teray Sadqay Way Dildara, Ajj Mukian Ne Tangan Pyar Dian... Singer(s): Noor Jehan
 Touch Me Not! Main Teri Aan, Main Teri, Gall Shak Di Kehri... Singer(s): Mala
 Way Neray Neray Aa, Seenay Naal La, Ik Mik Ho Kay Leye Aj Da Sawad... Singer(s): Mala

Release, box office, and reception
Khatarnak was released on 23 August 1974. The film was crowned as a jubilee hit at both Lahore and Karachi circuits. Despite being a box-office success, Khatarnak received huge criticism due to its vulgar songs and dances. The film also faced bans from time to time after its initial release in theaters.

Trivia
Khatarnak was a come-back movie in the career of actress Neelo who had left films since 1969.

References

External links

1974 films
1970s Punjabi-language films
Pakistani action films
Punjabi-language Pakistani films
Pakistani erotic films